Blurb is an American self-publishing platform that allows users to create, self-publish, promote, share, and sell their own print and ebooks. It also offers digital software for laying out books.

History
The company was founded in 2005 by Eileen Gittins and funded by Canaan Partners and Anthem Venture Partners. Blurb's headquarters are in San Francisco, California. Since its inception, Blurb has delivered more than 14 million books created by more than a half million customers.

Time magazine named Blurb one of 2006's "50 Coolest Web Sites".

The company generates nearly $100 million in revenues per year.

Blurb announced a partnership with Amazon in April 2014. The deal allows Blurb-designed books to be sold and distributed on the Amazon platform. The partnership enables self publishing on the platform with a 15% cut on Blurb books—a discount from previous fees of up to 45%. Amazon agreed to the fee to access Blurb's nearly two-million authors, who have produced 8 million books since 2006.

In May 2014 Blurb acquired MagCloud, a self-publishing platform for magazines, under a licensing agreement from HP. In the deal, Blurb has taken over the company's technology and operations, and nearly 10,000 customers. Blurb was acquired by their print fulfillment partner Reischling Press, Inc. (RPI) for an undisclosed amount in August of 2020.

Services

Blurb's book-making tools include BookWright (a downloadable tool), BookSmart), Blurb's PDF Uploader, the Blurb iOS app, and Blurb's plug-in for Adobe InDesign which allows book makers to design and upload their book's PDF files from within InDesign itself. Adobe's Lightroom Classic has a built-in Book module that Lightroom users can use to create and upload their books directly to Blurb for printing or for creation in ebook form.

Blurb authors can promote and share their books (including ebooks) using Blurb's free on-line marketing tools. They can also set their price and sell their books and ebooks in Blurb's online bookstore. Authors retain 100% of their markup with printed books and 80% of their selling cost with ebooks. Blurb's print-on-demand technology enables authors to print just as many books are ordered. Blurb offers seven book sizes, hardcover and softcover options, and a range of premium and professional-grade papers and end sheets. Blurb e-books are fixed format, enabling them to retain the same image and text placement when viewed on the Apple iPad as in the printed book version.

Awards 
In April 2008, Blurb was nominated for A 2008 Webby Award.
In August 2010, Blurb was announced as 2010 AOP Open Award Winner.
Blurb was an Inc. 500 No. 1 media company in 2010.

References

External links
 

Book publishing companies based in San Francisco
Digital press
Publishing companies established in 2005
Self-publishing online stores